Reckless Living is a 1931 American pre-Code drama film directed by Cyril Gardner and written by Cyril Gardner, Tom Reed and Courtney Terrett. The film stars Ricardo Cortez, Mae Clarke, Norman Foster, Marie Prevost, Slim Summerville and Robert Emmett O'Connor. The film was released on October 20, 1931, by Universal Pictures.

Cast 
Ricardo Cortez as Curly
Mae Clarke as Bee
Norman Foster as Doggie
Marie Prevost as Alice
Slim Summerville as The Drunk
Robert Emmett O'Connor as Ryan
Thomas E. Jackson as McManus
Louis Natheaux as Block
Murray Kinnell as Alf
Russell Hopton as Kid Regan
Perry Ivins as Spike
Brooks Benedict as Jerry
Frank Hagney as Henchman
Louise Beavers as Maid

References

External links 
 

1931 films
American drama films
1931 drama films
Universal Pictures films
Films directed by Cyril Gardner
American black-and-white films
1930s English-language films
1930s American films